Yamnuska Mountain Adventures is a mountaineering school and mountain adventure company located in Canmore, Alberta, Canada. The company was founded in 1975.

Name 
The company was named after Mount Yamnuska, a native name (Stoney) that translates to "flat-faced mountain". Mount Yamnuska is also a popular rock climbing destination.

History 

Yamnuska Inc. mountaineering school was created in 1975 as part of the YMCA's outdoor education centre at Seebe, about 80 km west of Calgary. Programs included backpacking, rock climbing and mountaineering.

Early instructors included James Blench, Barry Blanchard, Dwayne Congdon, Chris Miller, Marni Virtue and Sharon Wood - Barry Blanchard and James Blench are still involved with Yamnuska. The 'Wilderness Program' left the YMCA and 'Yamnuska Mountain School', a non-profit society directed by Bruce Elkin, was formed and based in the back of Bruce's and Barry Blanchard's house in Canmore, Alberta, Canada.

The next years saw a steady evolution, as instruction in mountaineering, rock and ice climbing became the core activity with the fall Mountain Skills Semester an annual event (the Mountain Skills Semester was created in 1980 and it is still offered by the company twice a year, spring and fall). By the early 80's Yamnuska was at the apex of the instructional market. Yamnuska became a for-profit company in late 1985. In 1989, David Begg, a New Zealand guide, became the owner of the company.

In 2005 the company was re-branded Yamnuska Mountain Adventures to reflect the growth in the soft-adventure programs. Individuals, groups, corporations and military organizations from all over the world choose Yamnuska as their provider. In 2010, Yamnuska transferred ownership to Len Youden, currently the General Manager. David Begg and Barry Blanchard are still working at Yamnuska as Associate Directors.

Guides 

All climbing, skiing and hiking guides are trained and certified by the Association of Canadian Mountain Guides (ACMG). The ACMG is a member-country of the International Federation of Mountain Guide Associations which is often known by its French acronym (UIAGM). Yamnuska guides operate within the strict terrain guidelines of the ACMG.

In 1993, Yamnuska was the second largest employer of Certified Mountain Guides in North America.

The very exacting standards to which Yamnuska's guides are held should not obscure the fact that the guides are the heart and soul of the company. Yamnuska's guides have been responsible for many new routes in the Canadian Rockies and abroad, like the following ones, by Barry Blanchard:
 1983 Andromeda Strain, Mount Andromeda, Canadian Rockies - first ascent of route.
 1985 Twins Tower, North Pillar, North Twin, Canadian Rockies - first ascent of route.
 1988 North Face, Howse Peak, Canadian Rockies - first ascent of route.
 1991 North Face of Kusum Kanguru, Nepal - first ascent of route.
 1991 Blanchard-Twight on Les Droites, Mont Blanc Massif, French Alps - hard new route with Marc Francis Twight.
 1999 M-16, East Face of Howse Peak, Canada - first ascent (in winter) with Steve House and Scott Backes.
 2000 Infinite Spur on Mount Foraker, Alaska - third ascent.
 2002 Infinite Patience on the Emperor Face of Mount Robson - first ascent.
 2005 First ascent of "Supper Machine" 5.9, WI 5, East End of Rundle, Canadian Rockies. Ascent of the SE ridge of Mt Asperity, ED2, 5.9, WI2, and N face of Bravo Peak, ED1, 5.8, WI4, Waddington Range, Coast Mountains, British Columbia.

Sponsorship and Community Involvement 
 John Lauchlan Award
Yamnuska Mountain Adventures is an annual supporter of the JLA, an award designed to assist expeditions of Canadian mountaineers and explorers. The criteria for the award includes Innovation, Canadian, Exploratory, Environmentally Sensitive, Bold, Lightweight & self-contained, and Non-commercial.
 Canmore Knuckle Basher Ice Climbing Festival
Yamnuska Mountain Adventures sponsored the Knuckle Basher 2010 Ice Climbing Festival. Yamnuska guides ran the skills clinics.
 Banff Youth Climbing Competition
Yamnuska Mountain Adventures sponsored different categories from 2007 - 2010. The competition hosts young climbers from Western Canada.
 Banded Peak Challenge
The Banded Peak Challenge was created in 2000 and raises money for The Easter Seals Camp Horizon in Bragg Creek, AB, Canada.
 Banff Mountain Book Festival
Yamnuska Mountain Adventures sponsors the Award for Best Book - Mountain Exposition. The Banff Mountain Book Festival is an annual book festival that celebrates mountain literature. The Mountain Exposition category includes guidebooks and "how-to" books dealing with physical activity in a mountain area.
 Alpine Club of Canada's annual Mountain Guide's Ball Fundraiser

Environmental Initiatives 
Yamnuska is committed to sustainable travel and tourism and helps to promote the preservation of the fragile alpine areas of the world's mountains. Their programs are typically human-powered endeavors that use self-propelled means of travel and they strive to cut their impact on the environment by supporting local and national environmental organizations, like Leave No Trace.

Memberships 

Yamnuska Mountain Adventures is a member of:
 Tourism Canmore Kananaskis
 Banff Lake Louise Tourism Bureau
 Canadian Avalanche Association
 Alpine Club of Canada
 Leave No Trace Canada
 Year Out Group

Guiding Permits 

Yamnuska Mountain Adventures holds guiding permits for 
 Banff National Park,
 Bow Valley,
 Glacier National Park (Canada),
 Jasper National Park,
 Kananaskis Country in Alberta, Canada.
 Kootenay National Park,
 Mount Assiniboine Provincial Park,
 Mount Robson Provincial Park in British Columbia,
 Peter Lougheed Provincial Park
 The Bugaboos,
 Yoho National Park,

Other Services 
 Corporate Training
Mountain skills and leadership courses
 Film Production
Yamnuska supplies guides to ensure safety when shooting in dangerous locations, sources stunt and photo doubles for mountain shoots and assists with location scouting. Hollywood films like K2, Vertical Limit and Cliffhanger had Yamnuska's presence, either as a company or with Barry Blanchard as a double.
 Military Training
Yamnuska has supplied mountaineering and rock instructors for the British Army for 14 years (in 2010) and provides instruction and logistical support for the Royal Canadian Army Cadets - Rocky Mountain National Army Cadet Summer Training Centre (RMNACSTC) in the Canadian Rockies.

References

External links 
 Yamnuska Mountain Adventures
 Barry Blanchard's Personal Website

Canadian Rockies
Calgary Region
Climbing organizations
Outdoor recreation organizations
Backpacking
Adventure travel
Tourism in Alberta